Guillermo Andrés Rivera Aránguiz (born 2 February 1989, in San Felipe, Chile) is a Chilean former professional tennis player. Rivera represented Chile in March 2011 against the United States, making his Davis Cup debut by playing the fifth rubber against John Isner, losing the match 3–6, 7–6, 5–7. It would be the only Davis Cup match of his career.

Singles finals

Notes

References

External links
 
 
 

1989 births
Living people
Chilean male tennis players
Tennis players at the 2011 Pan American Games
Pan American Games silver medalists for Chile
Pan American Games medalists in tennis
Medalists at the 2011 Pan American Games
21st-century Chilean people